Georgi Georgiev (born January 30, 1976) is a Bulgarian judoka.

Career
The career began in his native Pazardzhik under the direction of Ivan Filipov. He trained at the CSKA Army Sports Center in Sofia under the direction of Simeon Cenev. At the top level, he studied the vest wrestling styles combined judo and sambo. He won the world champion title twice, in 2003 and again in 2006. In 2000, at the Sydney Olympics, he lost in second round to Hüseyin Özkan of Turkey. In 2004, he improved in the Summer Olympics in Athens and won the bronze medal where he lost in the semifinals against the Japanese judoka Masato Uchishiba. He ended his career in 2009. 

Currently he works as a coach. at a judo club established by him in his native town Pazardzhik, called "Kodokan 2008".

Achievements

References

External links
 
 

1976 births
Living people
Bulgarian male judoka
Judoka at the 2000 Summer Olympics
Judoka at the 2004 Summer Olympics
Olympic judoka of Bulgaria
Sportspeople from Pazardzhik
Olympic medalists in judo
Medalists at the 2004 Summer Olympics
Olympic bronze medalists for Bulgaria